Jason Stewart (born 1971) is an American film and television editor best known for his work on independent films and reality television. He has edited three films that have shown at the Sundance Film Festival: World's Greatest Dad, Sleeping Dogs Lie, and Douchebag.

Stewart, the younger brother of the writer Amy N. Stewart graduated from the Academy of Art University in San Francisco with a degree in film. He moved to Los Angeles and began a career editing reality television shows and two films by Bobcat Goldthwait.

Films
Cornhole: The Movie (2010) - editor
World's Greatest Dad (2009) - editor. Film starring Robin Williams and directed by Bobcat Goldthwait.
Ocean of Pearls (2008) - editor
Sleeping Dogs Lie (2006) - editor. Directed by Bobcat Goldthwait.

Television
Minute to Win It - Supervising editor, three episodes.
My Dad Is Better Than Your Dad - Editor, three episodes.
Are You Smarter Than a 5th Grader - Editor, 28 episodes.
The Voice - Editor, 21 episodes.

References

External links 
 

1971 births
Living people
American television editors
People from Los Angeles
Academy of Art University alumni
American film editors